In thermodynamics, Carnot's theorem, developed in 1824 by Nicolas Léonard Sadi Carnot, also called Carnot's rule, is a principle that specifies limits on the maximum efficiency that any heat engine can obtain.

Carnot's theorem states that all heat engines operating between the same two thermal or heat reservoirs can't have efficiencies greater than a reversible heat engine operating between the same reservoirs. A corollary of this theorem is that every reversible heat engine operating between a pair of heat reservoirs is equally efficient, regardless of the working substance employed or the operation details. Since a Carnot heat engine is also a reversible engine, the efficiency of all the reversible heat engines is determined as the efficiency of the Carnot heat engine that depends solely on the temperatures of its hot and cold reservoirs.

  is greater than zero if and only if there is a temperature difference between the two thermal reservoirs. Since   is the upper limit of all reversible and irreversible heat engine efficiencies, it is concluded that work from a heat engine can be produced if and only if there is a temperature difference between two thermal reservoirs connecting to the engine.

Carnot's theorem is a consequence of the second law of thermodynamics. Historically, it was based on contemporary caloric theory, and preceded the establishment of the second law.

Proof

The proof of the Carnot theorem is a proof by contradiction or reductio ad absurdum (a method to prove a statement by assuming its falsity and logically deriving a false or contradictory statement from this assumption), based on a situation like the right figure where two heat engines with different efficiencies are operating between two thermal reservoirs at different temperature. The relatively hotter reservoir is called the hot reservoir and the other reservoir is called the cold reservoir. A (not necessarily reversible) heat engine  with a greater efficiency  is driving a reversible heat engine  with a less efficiency , causing the latter to act as a heat pump. The requirement for the engine  to be reversible is necessary to explain work  and heat  associated with it by using its known efficiency. However, since , the net heat flow would be backwards, i.e., into the hot reservoir:

If heat  flows from the hot reservoir then it has the sign of + while if  flows from the hot reservoir then it has the sign of -. This expression can be easily derived by using the definition of the efficiency of a heat engine, where work and heat in this expression are net quantities per engine cycle, and the conservation of energy for each engine as shown below. The sign convention of work , with which the sign of + for work done by an engine to its surroundings, is employed.

The above expression means that heat into the hot reservoir from the engine pair (can be considered as a single engine) is greater than heat into the engine pair from the hot reservoir (i.e., the hot reservoir continuously gets energy). A reversible heat engine with a low efficiency delivers more heat (energy) to the hot reservoir for a given amount of work (energy) to this engine when it is being driven as a heat pump. All these mean that heat can transfer from cold to hot places without external work, and such a heat transfer is impossible by the second law of thermodynamics. 

 It may seem odd that a hypothetical reversible heat pump with a low efficiency is used to violate the second law of thermodynamics, but the figure of merit for refrigerator units is not the efficiency, but the coefficient of performance (COP), which is  where this  has the sign opposite to the above (+ for work done to the engine).

Let's find the values of work and heat  depicted in the right figure in which a reversible heat engine  with a less efficiency  is driven as a heat pump by a heat engine  with a more efficiency .

The denominator of the second expression, is made to make the expression to be consistent, and it helps to fill the values of work and heat for the engine .

For each engine, the absolute value of the energy entering the engine, must be equal to the absolute value of the energy leaving from the engine, . Otherwise, energy is continuously accumulated in an engine or the conservation of energy is violated by taking more energy from an engine than input energy to the engine:

In the second expression,  is used to find the term  describing the amount of heat taken from the cold reservoir, completing the absolute value expressions of work and heat in the right figure.

Having established that the right figure values are correct, Carnot's theorem may be proven for irreversible and the reversible heat engines as shown below.

Reversible engines
To see that every reversible engine operating between reservoirs at temperatures  and  must have the same efficiency, assume that two reversible heat engines have different efficiencies, and let the relatively more efficient engine  drive the relatively less efficient engine  as a heat pump. As the right figure shows, this will cause heat to flow from the cold to the hot reservoir without external work, which violates the second law of thermodynamics. Therefore, both (reversible) heat engines have the same efficiency, and we conclude that:

All reversible heat engines that operate between the same two thermal (heat) reservoirs have the same efficiency.

The reversible heat engine efficiency can be determined by analyzing a Carnot heat engine as one of reversible heat engine.

This conclusion is an important result because it helps establish the Clausius theorem, which implies that the change in entropy  is unique for all reversible processes:

as the entropy change, that is made during a transition from a thermodynamic equilibrium state  to a state  in a V-T (Volume-Temperature) space, is the same over all reversible process paths between these two states. If this integral were not path independent, then entropy would not be a state variable.

Irreversible engines
Let's think two engines, one is  that is relatively more efficient irreversible engine while the other is  that is relatively less efficient reversible engine, and we construct a machine described in the right figure ( drives  as a heat pump). Then this machine violates the second law of thermodynamics. Since a Carnot heat engine is a reversible heat engine, with the conclusion in the discussion about two reversible heat engines above, we have the first part of Carnot's theorem:

No irreversible heat engine is more efficient than a Carnot heat engine operating between the same two thermal reservoirs.

Definition of thermodynamic temperature

The efficiency of a heat engine is the work done by the engine divided by the heat introduced to the engine per engine cycle or

Because all reversible heat engines operating between temperatures  and  must have the same efficiency, the efficiency of a reversible heat engine is a function of only the two reservoir temperatures:

This can only be the case if

Specializing to the case that  is a fixed reference temperature: the temperature of the triple point of water as 273.16. (Of course any reference temperature and any positive numerical value could be used — the choice here corresponds to the Kelvin scale.)

Therefore, if thermodynamic temperature is defined by

then the function viewed as a function of thermodynamic temperature, is

It follows immediately that

Substituting this equation back into the above equation  gives a relationship for the efficiency in terms of thermodynamic temperatures:

Applicability to fuel cells and batteries
Since fuel cells and batteries can generate useful power when all components of the system are at the same temperature, they are clearly not limited by Carnot's theorem, which states that no power can be generated when . This is because Carnot's theorem applies to engines converting thermal energy to work, whereas fuel cells and batteries instead convert chemical energy to work. Nevertheless, the second law of thermodynamics still provides restrictions on fuel cell and battery energy conversion.

A Carnot battery is a type of energy storage system that stores electricity in heat storage and converts the stored heat back to electricity through thermodynamic cycles.

See also
 Chambadal–Novikov efficiency
 Heating and cooling efficiency bounds

References

Laws of thermodynamics
Physics theorems
Thought experiments in physics